The ABCA/Rawlings High School All-America Baseball Team has been named every year since 1969, with the exceptions of 1993 and 2020. Between 1971–1975 and in 2000, only one team was selected per year. In 1969–1970, 1976 and 1987, two teams were selected per year. Each team has consisted of between 10 and 25 players at various designated positions.

, the schools with the most selections all-time are Cherry Creek High School in Greenwood Village, Colorado, Farragut High School in Farragut, Tennessee and Bishop Gorman High School in Las Vegas, with eight apiece. California has had more selections and more than twice as many First Team selections as any other state, with 312 and 141 respectively.

Thirty players have been named to the team twice. Bill McGuire of Creighton Preparatory School was the first to accomplish the feat in 1981 and 1982. , Tripp MacKay, Joey Gallo, Jack Flaherty, Jace Bohrofen and Druw Jones are the only players to be named to the First Team twice. 

In 2001, Casey Kotchman and John Killalea of Seminole High School became the first pair of high school teammates to be named to the First Team in the same year. Scott Kazmir and Clint Everts of Cypress Falls High School accomplished the same feat in the following year. Adrian Cárdenas and Chris Marrero of Monsignor Edward Pace High School followed in 2006.

Ten honorees have gone on to be enshrined in the National Baseball Hall of Fame and Museum while seven have been inducted into the National College Baseball Hall of Fame. John Elway of Granada Hills High School is enshrined in the Pro Football Hall of Fame and Condredge Holloway of Lee High School is enshrined in the Canadian Football Hall of Fame.

Eighteen selectees have later won a Major League Baseball (MLB) Most Valuable Player Award, eight players have won a Cy Young Award. As highly touted prospects, 23 players have subsequently been selected first overall in the MLB draft and nine have won an MLB Rookie of the Year Award.

Eighteen players named to one of the three teams have played football professionally, including Josh Booty, Chad Hutchinson and Drew Henson who played in both the National Football League and MLB. Ryan Minor of Hammon High School in Hammon, Oklahoma played professional basketball and in MLB. Scott Burrell of Hamden High School is the only honoree to go on to play basketball in the National Basketball Association.

Key

Teams

1969–1979

1980–1989

1990–1999

2000–2009

2010–2014

2015–2019

2020–present

Selections by state

See also
 USA Today All-USA high school baseball team
 Under Armour All-America Baseball Game

References 

Awards established in 1969
Baseball trophies and awards in the United States
High school baseball in the United States
Student athlete awards in the United States